Bryotypella is a genus of moths of the family Noctuidae.

Species
 Bryotypella leucosticta (Moore, 1882)

References
 Bryotypella at Markku Savela's Lepidoptera and Some Other Life Forms
Natural History Museum Lepidoptera genus database

Xyleninae